Micromonospora ureilytica is a bacterium from the genus Micromonospora which has been isolated from nodules from the plant Pisum sativum in Canizal, Spain.

References

 

Micromonosporaceae
Bacteria described in 2016